The 1977–78 NBA season was the Braves' eighth and final season in the NBA. Entering the season, the Braves were allowed an escape clause in their lease, because season ticket sales did not reach the set goal of 4,500. The Braves suffered another disappointment as Tiny Archibald (whom they acquired from the New Jersey Nets for George Johnson) was lost for the year due to an Achilles tendon injury in the preseason.

The Braves played competitively in November with a respectable .500 record at 10–10. Despite the promising start, the Braves won just nine games over the next three months. While the Braves were struggling on the court, owner John Y. Brown was brokering a deal to take over the legendary Boston Celtics franchise. Celtics owner Irv Levin wanted to move the historic franchise to California. However, the NBA would not allow him to take the cornerstone franchise out of Boston.

NBA Lawyer David Stern offered a comprise in which Levin and Brown would swap franchises. The concept was that Levin would take over the Braves and move them to San Diego. The Braves finished in fourth place in the Atlantic Division with a 27–55 record, and played their last game on April 9, ironically, in Boston. Owners voted 21–1 to approve the deal, and the Braves moved from Buffalo to San Diego; the team was renamed the San Diego Clippers for the 1978–79 season.

The deal also included a seven-player trade in which the Celtics acquired Archibald, Billy Knight, and Marvin Barnes. The San Diego-bound Braves received Freeman Williams, back-up center Kevin Kunnert, and power forwards Kermit Washington and Sidney Wicks. The team would not request a draft pick in the deal, allowing the Celtics to retain the draft rights to Larry Bird in 1979.

Offseason

NBA Draft

Roster
{| class="toccolours" style="font-size: 95%; width: 100%;"
|-
! colspan="2" style="background-color: #E23B45;  color: #FFFFFF; text-align: center;" | Buffalo Braves 1977–78 roster
|- style="background-color: #106BB4; color: #FFFFFF;   text-align: center;"
! Players !! Coaches
|-
| valign="top" |
{| class="sortable" style="background:transparent; margin:0px; width:100%;"
! Pos. !! # !! Nat. !! Name !! Ht. !! Wt. !! From
|-

Regular season

Season standings

Record vs. opponents

Player stats

Awards and honors
 Randy Smith, 1978 NBA All-Star Game MVP

Transactions
The Braves were involved in the following transactions during the 1977–78 season.

Coaching Change

Trades

Free agents

Additions

Subtractions

References

 Braves on Database Basketball
 Braves on Basketball Reference

Buffalo
Buffalo Braves seasons
Buffalo
Buffalo